Janne Pitko (born September 8, 1981) is a Finnish curler from Espoo. He competed at the 2015 Ford World Men's Curling Championship in Halifax, Nova Scotia, Canada, as lead for the Finnish national curling team. He is a professional poker player outside of curling, and helps support the Finland national football team.

References

External links
 

1981 births
Living people
Finnish male curlers
People from Kemi
Sportspeople from Espoo
21st-century Finnish people